Parisi (stylised as PARISI)  are an Italian music production and songwriting duo formed by multi-instrumentalist brothers Marco Parisi & Giampaolo "Jack" Parisi.
The duo made their international breakthrough in 2019, collaborating on several tracks on Ed Sheeran's album No.6 Collaborations Project. The duo work in Pop, Dance-Pop, House, and Hip Hop.

Biography 
Marco & Jack grew up in Salerno and were surrounded by music from childhood. Their father was a professional world-touring keyboard player and music shop owner who introduced the brothers to music through multi-instrument jams in their living room. These jams formed some of their earliest memories and greatly influenced their later lives as musicians, encouraging them to incorporate different genres, instruments, and the latest technology into their music to create a distinctive fusion of sounds.

The brothers are key collaborators of London-based high-tech music technology company ROLI as product specialists. Their virtuosic skills as instrumentalists came to the attention of the company CEO Roland Lamb in 2016, and he describes meeting Parisi as "one of the most important landmarks for me in the history of this whole project". They have since performed a number of demos of new ROLI products, most notably the company's trademark MIDI-controller, the Seaboard. They have employed ROLI instruments in their production and co-production work, including on Ed Sheeran's album No.6 Collaborations Project.

Career 
PARISI's earliest prominent release was their 2016 single 'No Refuge' featuring RZA. The single was a response to the ongoing refugee crisis, with all proceeds going to UN Refugee Agency. Following this release began a period of regular co-production and songwriting work that has seen them work with a wide range of artists including Will.i.am, TY1, Clementino, Marracash, Black Eyed Peas and Jackson Penn.

In 2019, the duo began an ongoing working relationship with Fred Again, resulting in a co-production credit on Ed Sheeran's Afterglow, as well as 6 co-productions and co-writes on Fred Again's debut album Actual Life

The duo are writing with Fred Gibson, Johnny McDaid, Paul Harris, Alma, Eyelar, Johnny Orlando, Josh Record and Tom Misch. They have co-writing and/or co-production credits on upcoming releases from Fred Again, Elderbrook, Valencia Grace, Mae Muller and Tiësto.

Discography

Singles

Songwriting/Production Credits

References 

Living people
Italian songwriters
Italian record producers
Remixers
Place of birth missing (living people)
Year of birth missing (living people)